The Lower Rhenish–Westphalian Circle was an Imperial Circle of the Holy Roman Empire. It comprised territories of the former Duchy of Lower Lorraine, Frisia and the Westphalian part of the former Duchy of Saxony.

The circle was made up of numerous small states, however the Counts De la Marck were able to collect a significant amount of territories, the United Duchies of Jülich-Cleves-Berg from 1521 on. The Empire's largest ecclesiastical territory was held by the Prince-Bishops of Münster.

Composition 
The circle was made up of the following states:

Transfers
 The Duchy of Guelders passed to the Burgundian Circle in 1548
 Luxemburg passed to the Burgundian Circle in 1512
 The County of Drenthe passed to the Burgundian Circle in 1548 
 The Lordship of Groningen passed to the Burgundian Circle in 1548 
 The Lordship of Overijssel passed to the Burgundian Circle in 1548 
 The Bishopric of Utrecht passed to the Burgundian Circle in 1548 
 The County of Zutphen passed to the Burgundian Circle in 1548

References 
 Imperial Circles in the 16th Century Historical Maps of Germany
 The list of states making up the Lower Rhenish–Westphalian Circle is based in part on that in the German Wikipedia article Niederrheinisch-Westfälischer Reichskreis.
  List of the imperial circles of 1532

External links 

 
Circles of the Holy Roman Empire
Westphalian Lowland
1500s establishments in the Holy Roman Empire
1500 establishments in Europe